Dick's Picks Volume 11 is the 11th live album in the Dick's Picks series of releases by the Grateful Dead. It was recorded at the Stanley Theater in Jersey City on September 27, 1972.

This release is known to have a patched cut in the original soundboard tapes. If certain soundboards are missing parts of a song those creating the release will attempt to patch the cut if possible. Sometimes this is from an audience source or from an entirely different show. There is no database for these fixed soundboards and hence is up to the listeners to stumble upon such a discovery. Track 2 on Disc 2, I Know You Rider, contains a patch from 1972-09-24 which occurs at 1:55 to 2:20 on the track. It is possible that there are other fixed cuts on this release.

Enclosure and concert notes

Included in the release is a single sheet of paper, printed on both sides and folded into thirds, yielding a six-page enclosure.  The front cover is a replica of the disc's cover and the back cover shows a small, oval-shaped image of what looks like a Sconce (light fixture) or other small sculpture, engraved with Stanley in uppercase and presumably from the venue, against a background of clouds that flows seamlessly into the clouds on the cover.  The inside contains three pages of notes about the show and a page listing the contents of and credits for the release.

Concert notes

Appearing above a blurry image of some of the crowd is a series of "Concert notes by Paul Grushkin 9/27/72, Stanley Theater, Jersey City, NJ".  These notes are written in a stream-of-consciousness style consisting of mostly incomplete sentences in lowercase with minimal punctuation.

After a short introduction that mentions, for example, that the venue is a "plushy vaudeville palace, like the Harding in SF only bigger", the notes list each song the band played that night along with the author's impressions.  Excerpts from some of these impressions follow.

Morning Dew: "to open the first set????"
Friend of the Devil: "starting to get body rushes", followed by a list of what each band member is wearing.
Playin' in the Band: "it's Bobby! ... into convoluted Miles Davis kind of thrash and squall Donna s c r e a m s at end break at 10:18 we stumble around and take stock".
He's Gone: "by god they're having a great time family-style interplay betw. bandmembers".  This entry is the second-longest of all of them.
Dark Star: "reverent applause, everything else tonite maybe just a lead-up".  This entry is the longest of all of them.  It ends with "a full-blown psycho circus" in uppercase followed immediately by:
"into Cumberland Blues shrill, insistent lead drilling a hole in my head".
Uncle John's Band: "sweet happiness everywhere, all around  epiphany in Jersey City".

Grushkin ends his piece with: "12:40 am. stumbling out into Jersey half-light completely dead to the world did they really open with Morning Dew?"

Track listing

Disc one
First set:
"Morning Dew" (Bonnie Dobson, Tim Rose) – 12:38
"Beat It on Down the Line" (Jesse Fuller) – 3:34
"Friend of the Devil" (Jerry Garcia, John Dawson, Hunter) – 4:06
"Black-Throated Wind" (John Barlow, Bob Weir) – 6:52
"Tennessee Jed" (Garcia, Hunter) – 8:08
"Mexicali Blues" (Barlow, Weir) – 3:39
"Bird Song" (Garcia, Hunter) – 11:46
"Big River" (Johnny Cash) – 4:51
"Brokedown Palace" (Garcia, Hunter) – 5:59
"El Paso" (Marty Robbins) – 4:42

Disc two

First set, continued:
"China Cat Sunflower" (Garcia, Hunter) – 7:25 →
"I Know You Rider" (traditional) – 5:26
"Playing in the Band"  (Mickey Hart, Hunter, Weir) – 16:14
Second set:
"He's Gone" (Garcia, Hunter) – 13:30
"Me & My Uncle" (John Phillips) – 3:38
"Deal" (Garcia, Hunter) – 4:51
"Greatest Story Ever Told" (Hart, Hunter, Weir) – 5:29
"Ramble on Rose" (Garcia, Hunter) – 6:28

Disc three

Second set, continued:
"Dark Star" (Grateful Dead, Hunter) – 30:49 →
"Cumberland Blues" (Garcia, Hunter, Lesh) – 6:55
"Attics of My Life" (Garcia, Hunter) – 5:11
"Promised Land" (Chuck Berry) – 3:04
"Uncle John's Band" (Garcia, Hunter) – 8:43
"Casey Jones" (Garcia, Hunter) – 7:29
Encore:
"Around and Around" (Berry) – 5:18

Personnel 
Grateful Dead:
Jerry Garcia – lead guitar, vocals
Bill Kreutzmann – percussion
Phil Lesh – bass, vocals
Bob Weir – guitar, vocals
Donna Jean Godchaux – vocals
Keith Godchaux – keyboards
Production:
Dick Latvala – tape archivist
Gecko Graphics – design
Owsley Stanley, Bob Matthews – recording
Jeffrey Norman – CD mastering
John Cutler – magnetic scrutinizer
Jonas Grushkin – photography
Paul Grushkin – CD liner notes

References

11
1998 live albums